Del Russel (born Del Gregory Russo; September 27, 1952 – February 7, 2015) was an American actor and the son of actor Tony Russel and Jodean Lawrence.

Filmography

References

External links
 

American male film actors
American television actors
1952 births
2015 deaths
People from Pasadena, California